The 2019–20 CONCACAF Nations League was the inaugural season of the CONCACAF Nations League, an international association football competition involving the men's national teams of the 41 member associations of CONCACAF. The Nations League qualifying tournament also served as part of the qualifying process for the 2019 CONCACAF Gold Cup, which was expanded from twelve to sixteen teams. The group stage of the tournament also served as qualification for the 2021 CONCACAF Gold Cup. The final tournament, which decided the inaugural champions, was originally scheduled to be played in June 2020. On 3 April 2020, the final tournament was postponed until March 2021 due to the COVID-19 pandemic. On 22 September 2020, CONCACAF announced that the final tournament was again rescheduled until June 2021. On 24 February 2021, CONCACAF confirmed the dates for the rescheduled Nations League Finals, 3 and 6 June 2021 with the venue later confirmed as Empower Field at Mile High in Denver, Colorado.

Format
The format proposals were first formally investigated at the XXXII CONCACAF Ordinary Congress in Oranjestad, Aruba on 8 April 2017. The tournament was officially confirmed by CONCACAF in November 2017. The format and schedule of the Nations Leagues was announced on 7 March 2018, 10:00 EST (UTC−5), at The Temple House in Miami Beach, Florida, United States.

The Nations League began with a one-off qualifying phase, played across four matchdays from September 2018 to March 2019. The results determined the composition of the leagues for the group phase of the tournament. Apart from the six teams which participated in the 2018 FIFA World Cup qualifying hexagonal, the other 34 teams (Guatemala could not enter due to FIFA suspension) entered qualifying. Each team played four matches, two home and two away, with the results compiled into an aggregate table. Based on the standings, the teams were divided into tiers for the group phase of the inaugural edition of the CONCACAF Nations League. Moreover, the top ten teams in the qualifying phase qualified for the 2019 CONCACAF Gold Cup, joining the six hexagonal participants.

The group phase of the Nations League, consisting of three tiered leagues, was played in the official FIFA match windows in September, October, and November 2019. All eligible teams were assigned by sporting performance into Leagues A, B, and C. Each league was sub-divided into four groups, featuring promotion and relegation, in which the teams competed in a home-and-away, round-robin format over the course of the group phase.

League A contained twelve teams, split into four groups of three teams. The six hexagonal participants were joined by the top six teams from qualifying. The four group winners qualified for the Nations League final championship, played in June 2021, which determined the champions of the new competition. The four teams which finished last in their group were relegated to League B for the next edition of the tournament.

League B consisted of sixteen teams, split into four groups of four teams. The league contained teams which finished from 7th to 22nd in qualifying. The four group winners were promoted to League A, while the four teams which finished last in their group were relegated to League C for the next edition.

League C consisted of the remaining thirteen member associations, the teams which finished 23rd to 34th in qualifying, along with Guatemala, who did not enter qualifying. The league contained four groups, with three groups of three teams and one group of four teams. The four group winners were promoted to League B for the next edition of the competition.

In September 2019, it was announced that the Nations League would also provide qualification for all sixteen teams participating in the 2021 CONCACAF Gold Cup (no teams would qualify automatically).

The following teams qualified for the Gold Cup after group play concluded in November 2019:

The top two teams from each of the four League A groups
The winners of each of the four League B groups

Initially, the final four spots at the Gold Cup were to be determined by two-legged matches between the second-place finishers of League B and the first-place finishers of League C, to be played in March 2020. The four winners of this round would then advance to the second round, to face the third-place finishers of League A, in matches to be played in June 2020. The four matchup winners of the second round would qualify for the 2021 Gold Cup. However, following the COVID-19 pandemic, this format was changed. In July 2020, CONCACAF announced that the qualifiers would be played by the twelve aforementioned teams as a centralized preliminary round in the United States, in the week prior to the 2021 Gold Cup group stage. In September 2020, CONCACAF announced that Qatar were invited to the Gold Cup as guests, and that the qualification tournament would determine the last three teams to participate in the group stage of the Gold Cup. The qualification tournament will feature two rounds, with the twelve participating teams divided into six one-off ties in the first round. The six winners will advance to the second round, with the winners of the three one-off matches qualifying for the Gold Cup.

Tiebreakers
The ranking of teams in each group was determined as follows (Regulations Article 12.7):

 Points obtained in all group matches (three points for a win, one for a draw, zero for a loss);
 Goal difference in all group matches;
 Number of goals scored in all group matches;
 Points obtained in the matches played between the teams in question;
 Goal difference in the matches played between the teams in question;
 Number of goals scored in the matches played between the teams in question;
 Number of away goals scored in the matches played between the teams in question (if the tie was only between two teams);
 Fair play points in all group matches (only one deduction could be applied to a player in a single match):
 Yellow card: −1 points;
 Indirect red card (second yellow card): −3 points;
 Direct red card: −4 points;
 Yellow card and direct red card: −5 points;
 Drawing of lots.

Entrants
All of CONCACAF's 41 member associations participated in the competition. The six teams which participated in the fifth round (hexagonal) of 2018 FIFA World Cup qualification received automatic entry into League A. Of the remaining 35 teams, 34 entered into qualifying to determine which league they entered. The National Football Federation of Guatemala was suspended by FIFA in October 2016, and therefore Guatemala was ineligible to enter qualifying after missing the deadline of 1 March 2018. However, as the suspension was lifted by FIFA in May 2018, they automatically entered into League C of the group phase.

Notes

Schedule
Below was the schedule of the 2019–20 CONCACAF Nations League.

The Nations League Finals were originally scheduled for the international window from 23 to 31 March 2020. However, on 5 August 2019 CONCACAF announced that the tournament would instead be played in June 2020. The schedule for the tournament was announced on 9 March 2020, with the semi-finals on 4 June, and the third place play-off and final on 7 June 2020. On 3 April 2020, the tournament was postponed due to the COVID-19 pandemic. On 27 July 2020, CONCACAF announced that the tournament would be held in the international window from 22 to 30 March 2021. However, due to the postponement of the first round of CONCACAF World Cup qualifying, on 22 September 2020 CONCACAF announced that the final tournament would be held in June 2021.

The fixture list for the group phase was confirmed by CONCACAF on 21 May 2019.

Qualifying

The draw for the qualifying fixtures was held on 7 March 2018 directly after the launch event of the CONCACAF Nations League. The 34 teams were seeded into four pots based on their position in the March 2018 CONCACAF Ranking Index. A computerized pre-draw produced a "master schedule", creating 17 fixtures for each matchday. The teams in each pot were then drawn to the corresponding positions in the schedule. The computer model assured that no teams would face each other more than once, and that each team would play two home and two away matches. Based on their results, the teams were divided into tiers for the main round of the inaugural edition of the CONCACAF Nations League. Moreover, the top ten teams qualified for the 2019 CONCACAF Gold Cup to join the six hexagonal participants.

Seeding
The 41 CONCACAF members were allocated into pots of the league for which they qualified. Teams were seeded into pots based on their position in the November 2018 CONCACAF Ranking Index. League A had three pots of four teams, while League B had four pots of four teams. League C had three pots, with pots 1 and 2 featuring four teams each, and pot 3 featuring five teams.

The draw for the group phase took place at The Chelsea Theater in Las Vegas, Nevada, United States on 27 March 2019, 22:00 EDT (19:00 local time, PDT).

League A

Group A

Group B

Group C

Group D

Nations League Finals

Seeding

Bracket

All times are local, MDT (UTC−6).

Semi-finals

Third place play-off

Final

League B

Group A

Group B

Group C

Group D

League C

Group A

Group B

Group C

Group D

Top goalscorers

Notes

References

External links

 
2019-20
Nations League
September 2019 sports events in North America
October 2019 sports events in North America
November 2019 sports events in North America
June 2021 sports events in the United States